William W. Chase was a college football player. Chase was a prominent halfback for coach Dutch Stanley's Florida Gators of the University of Florida from 1933 to 1935. Chase was a native of Lakeland. A triple threat back, he was elected captain of the 1935 team. Memorably, he returned a kickoff ninety-eight yards against Ole Miss in 1934.  He was third-team AP All-SEC.

See also
 List of University of Florida Athletic Hall of Fame members

References

American football halfbacks
Florida Gators football players
Sportspeople from Lakeland, Florida